A nuclear-weapon-free zone (NWFZ) is defined by the United Nations as an agreement that a group of states has freely established by treaty or convention that bans the development, manufacturing, control, possession, testing, stationing or transporting of nuclear weapons in a given area, that has mechanisms of verification and control to enforce its obligations, and that is recognized as such by the General Assembly of the United Nations. NWFZs have a similar purpose to, but are distinct from, the Treaty on the Non-Proliferation of Nuclear Weapons to which most countries including five nuclear weapons states are a party. Another term, nuclear-free zone, often means an area that has banned both nuclear power and nuclear weapons, and sometimes nuclear waste and nuclear propulsion, and usually does not mean a UN-acknowledged international treaty.

The NWFZ definition does not count countries or smaller regions that have outlawed nuclear weapons simply by their own law, like Austria with the Atomsperrgesetz in 1999. Similarly the 2+4 Treaty, which led to German reunification, banned nuclear weapons in the new states of Germany (Berlin and former East Germany), but was an agreement only among the six signatory countries, without formal NWFZ mechanisms.

Geographic scope

Today there are five zones covering continental or subcontinental groups of countries (including their territorial waters and airspace), and three governing Antarctica, the seabed, and outer space which are not part of any state. The Antarctic, seabed, and space zones preceded all but one of the zones on national territories. Most of the Earth's oceans above the seabed are not covered by NWFZs since freedom of the seas restricts restrictions in international waters. The UN has also recognized one additional country, Mongolia, as having nuclear-weapon-free status.

NWFZs do not cover international waters (where there is freedom of the seas) or transit of nuclear missiles through space (as opposed to deployment of nuclear weapons in space).

 when the African NWFZ came into force, the six land zones cover 56% of the Earth's land area of 149 million square kilometers and 60% of the 195 states on Earth, up from 34% and 30% the previous year; however, only 39% of the world's population lives in NWFZs, while the nine nuclear weapons states have 28% of the world's land area and 46% of the world population.

The Antarctic, Latin American, and South Pacific zones are defined by lines of latitude and longitude, except for the northwestern boundary of the South Pacific zone which follows the limit of Australian territorial waters, and these three zones form a contiguous area, though treaty provisions do not apply to international waters within that area. In contrast, the Southeast Asian zone is defined as the territories of its members including their Exclusive Economic Zones, and the African zone is also defined as the countries and territories considered part of Africa by the OAU (now the African Union) which include islands close to Africa and Madagascar. An AU member, Mauritius, claims the British Indian Ocean Territory where Diego Garcia is currently a US military base.

Nuclear power in NWFZ states

Four NWFZ countries have nuclear plants to generate electricity.
South Africa formerly had a nuclear weapons program which it terminated in 1989.

Argentina and Brazil are known to operate uranium enrichment facilities. Countries that had enrichment programs in the past include Libya and South Africa, although Libya's facility was never operational. Australia has announced its intention to pursue commercial enrichment, and is actively researching laser enrichment.

Argentina and Brazil also have plans to build nuclear submarines.

Protocols for non-member states

Several of the NWFZ treaties have protocols under which states outside the zone that have territories within the zone can bring the provisions of the NWFZ into force for those territories.  All these territories are small islands except for French Guiana. The United States has signed but not ratified Protocol I to the Treaty of Rarotonga which would apply to American Samoa and Jarvis Island.  The United Kingdom does not accept that African NWFZ is applicable to the Indian Ocean island of Diego Garcia which has a U.S. military base.

Southern Hemisphere

Few prevailing winds cross the Equator and effects of nuclear explosions in the Northern Hemisphere might send less fallout to the Southern Hemisphere.

The five southern NWFZs together cover all land in the Southern Hemisphere except East Timor, still in the process of joining ASEAN, and Atlantic and Indian Ocean islands belonging to non-NWFZ countries in the box (map) bounded by 60° S, 20° W, and 115° E, which combined have less than 8000 km2 of land area:
 St. Helena and its dependencies Ascension Island and Tristan da Cunha, a British overseas territory
 Bouvet Island, a Norwegian territory
 Kerguelen, Crozet, Saint Paul and Amsterdam Islands, some of the French Southern Territories
 Chagos Islands (British Indian Ocean Territory) including Diego Garcia (disputed by Mauritius)
 Addu and Fuvahmulah, southernmost atolls of the Maldives

In 1994 states of the South Atlantic Peace and Cooperation Zone issued a "Declaration on the Denuclearization of the South Atlantic" which the U.N. General Assembly endorsed but the U.S., U.K., and France still opposed.

Tropics

The Latin American, African, South Pacific and Southeast Asian zones also cover most land in the tropics, but not some Northern Hemisphere areas south of the Tropic of Cancer. Most tropical land outside of NWFZs is in India and the Arabian Peninsula.

Little of the land area covered by the five southern Nuclear-Weapon-Free Zones extends north of the Tropic of Cancer: only northern Mexico, northern Bahamas, northern Myanmar, and North Africa. However, the Central Asian and Mongolian zones are entirely in the North Temperate Zone.

Northern Hemisphere

The majority of non-NWS non-NWFZ states are in Europe and the North Pacific and are members of (or surrounded by) collective security alliances with nuclear weapons states dating from the Cold War and predating the NWFZ movement.

Twenty-two states are not part of a NWFZ or a collective security bloc nor nuclear weapons states, twelve in the Middle East, six in South Asia, and four in the former Soviet Union.
There have been NWFZ proposals for the Middle East (e.g. Nuclear program of Iran#Nuclear Weapon Free Zone in the Middle East, 2009 UN proposal, 2011 IAEA forum), the Korean Peninsula, Central Europe, South Asia, South-east Asia, and the Arctic.

All countries without nuclear weapons, except South Sudan, are parties to the Non-Proliferation Treaty, as are the five NPT-sanctioned nuclear weapon states.

Europe
The UK, France, and the USA share a nuclear umbrella with the 25 other members of NATO, and the 6 European Union states not part of NATO (Austria, Cyprus, Ireland, Malta, Sweden, Finland) are part of the EU's Common Security and Defence Policy.

The other European countries west of the former Soviet Union are small Western European states and surrounded by and aligned with the EU and NATO but not members (Switzerland and European microstates Liechtenstein, Monaco, San Marino, Vatican, Andorra), or Balkan states that have not yet joined the EU (Albania, Bosnia, Montenegro, Macedonia, Serbia and Kosovo).

NATO also extends to Turkey and Canada.

Former Soviet Union
Belarus and Armenia, along with some members of the Central Asian NWFZ, are allies of Russia in CSTO, the three Baltic states have joined NATO, and the GUAM states (Georgia, Azerbaijan, Ukraine, Moldova) are not party to either security treaty.

North Pacific
South Korea and Japan are American allies under its nuclear umbrella, while the three Micronesian states (Marshall Islands, Federated States of Micronesia,  and Palau) are in a Compact of Free Association with the US.

South Asia
India and Pakistan are nuclear-armed states and the six other South Asian states (Afghanistan, Sri Lanka, Maldives, Bangladesh, Nepal, Bhutan) are not part of a NWFZ or security bloc.

Middle East

The six Gulf Cooperation Council states, the 5 other Arab League states outside Africa (Yemen, Jordan, Lebanon, Syria, Iraq), and Iran (see Nuclear program of Iran) are not nuclear weapons states and not part of a NWFZ.  The UN General Assembly has urged establishment of a Middle East NWFZ, and NPT Review Conferences in 1995 and 2010 called for a zone free of all weapons of mass destruction in the Middle East.  An International Conference For A WMD-Free Middle East was held in Haifa in December 2013 attended by citizens from all over the world concerned about the lack of progress in the official talks.

See also
 Lists of nuclear disasters and radioactive incidents
 Middle East nuclear weapon free zone
 Nuclear disarmament
 Prevention of nuclear catastrophe

References

External links
 Nuclear-Weapon-Free Zones Around the World site about NWFZs run by OPANAL, the organization which monitors the Treaty of Tlatelolco
 Oceans in the Nuclear Age:Nuclear-Free Zones from the Law of the Sea Institute at Boalt School of Law (University of California, Berkeley). Includes treaty texts.
 Nuclear Weapons Free Zones Briefing Paper from Atomic Mirror
 UN Pages on Nuclear Weapon Free Zones
 Nuclear Weapon-Free Zones Social Science Research Network, Marco Rossini, 2003
 Arctic Nuclear-Weapon-Free Zone Canadian Pugwash Group's initiative for an Arctic NWFZ